Edgeley is a suburb of Stockport, Greater Manchester, England.

Edgeley is characterised largely by Victorian terraced housing around Alexandra Park. The population in 2011 was 14,176.

Edgeley Park is home to Stockport County F.C.

History

References to Edgeley, or "Eddyshelegh", are recorded in the early part of the 13th century. However the main history of the area dates from the beginning of the industrial revolution where it was a working-class hub, after the 
fall of industrial Britain, Edgeley like a lot of northern urban areas suffered economically and the area fell into decay, after some subtle investment the area is slowly showing signs of improvement.

On 27 November 1792 an advertisement appeared in the Manchester Mercury to let land at Edgeley as:

An Eligible situation for Bleach Ground or Print Field in which there are a number of Fine White Sand Springs with a Rivulet capable of Turning Wash Wheels etc.  The Grounds lie very contiguous to the populous Manufacturing Town of Stockport where Bleachers and Printers are both much wanted and every encouragement will be given to a good tenant

William Sykes took the land and established the Sykes Bleaching Company. There were few trees in the area, but as wood was needed in the drying process, he undertook extensive tree-planting in the area.  He built a "stately house", Edgeley House, which was the home of the family for succeeding generations until it became Alexandra Park. Wells were sunk including the "Silver Well", and by 1830 these had quadrupled the water supply.  Reservoirs were also built. These undertakings were of great value to people in the area in times of excessive drought. The Sykes originally owned most of the land in Edgeley, and employed many people. They invested their wealth back into the area with parks, churches, schools and Edgeley Park.

The Brinksway Chapel, built in 1823, was nicknamed the 'Beef-Steak Chapel' as it was built to encourage vegetarianism by men with shares of one pound each. Saint Matthew's Church was built on the site in 1843.

Facilities
The commercial centre of Edgeley is Castle Street.

Alexandra Park is on the former site of Edgeley House and contains a bowling green, a children's play area, a tennis, basketball and football court and a skate park. The Sykes' reservoir, which originally served the bleaching works, backs onto the Park. The regeneration of the area has seen the mill lodge developed into a public space popular with anglers.

Edgeley is served by Stockport railway station (also known as "Stockport Edgeley" or "Edgeley"). It was opened on 15 February 1843 by the Manchester and Birmingham Railway, following completion of the large railway viaduct just to its north.

Notable people
 John Axon, British train driver (Edgeley Depot) who died in 1957 while trying to stop a runaway freight train on a 1 in 58 gradient at Chapel-en-le-Frith in Derbyshire after a brake failure. 
 John Axon, grandson of above, who played Nigel Harper in the ITV series The Royal and attended Avondale High School.
 Sidney Gilliat, British film director, born in Edgeley in 1908.
 Peter Hope, composer and arranger, born in Edgeley in 1930.
 Daz Sampson, 2006 UK Eurovision Song Contest contestant, grew up in Stockport and attended Avondale High School.

Richard Sykes (1839-1923),a member of the Sykes family at Edgeley House, founded the town of Edgeley, in North Dakota, United States, in tribute to his birthplace. Other members of the Sykes family include Thomas Hardcastle Sykes, Percy Sykes and Sir Alan Sykes, 1st Baronet.

Edgeley is also where current Manchester City F.C. player Phil Foden grew up.

External links

 Edgeley.org – A community website for Edgeley and the surrounding areas

References

Areas of Stockport